The 1993–1994 Highland Football League was won by Huntly. This was the final season that Ross County, Caledonian and Inverness Thistle competed.

Table

References

Highland Football League seasons
4